In France, a banlieue is a suburb of a large city, or all its suburbs taken collectively. Banlieues are divided into autonomous administrative entities and do not constitute part of the city proper. For instance, 80percent of the inhabitants of the Paris metropolitan area live outside the city of Paris.

Beginning in the 1970s, the term banlieue has taken on a particular connotation, becoming a popular word for economically-deprived suburbs featuring low-income housing projects (HLMs) that are home to large immigrant populations. People of foreign descent reside in what are often called poverty traps.

History

In France, since the establishment of the Third Republic at the beginning of the 1870s, communities beyond the city centre essentially stopped spreading their own boundaries, as a result of the extension of the larger Paris urban agglomeration. The city – which in France corresponds to the concept of the "urban unit" – does not necessarily have a correspondence with a single administrative location, and instead includes other communities that link themselves to the city centre and form the banlieues.

Since the annexation of the banlieues of major French cities during the Second Empire period (Lyon in 1852, Lille in 1858, Paris in 1860, Bordeaux in 1865), French cities have extended their boundaries very little desipte the growth of the cities. Almost all large and mid-sized cities in France with a banlieue have developed a couronne pėriurbaine (in English: near-urban ring).

Communities in the countryside beyond the near-urban ring are regarded as being outside the city's strongest social and economic sphere of influence, and are termed communes périurbaines. In either case, they are divided into numerous autonomous administrative entities.

Banlieues 89, a design-led urban policy backed by the French government, renovated over 140 low-cost estates, such as Les Minguettes and the Mas du Taureau block in Vaulx-en-Velin. Improvements were made in road and rail access, cafes and shops were built, and the towers and blocks were made to look more attractive. In Vaulx-en-Velin, for instance, shops and a library were built, houses were built to make the landscape more interesting, 2,500 homes were renovated, and the blocks were repainted.

Geography of the banlieues

The word banlieue is, in formal use, a socially neutral term, designating the urbanized zone located around the city centre, comprising both sparsely and heavily populated areas. Therefore, in the Parisian metropolitan area, for example, the wealthy suburb of Neuilly-sur-Seine may be referred to as a banlieue as might the poor suburb of La Courneuve. To distinguish them, Parisians refer to a banlieue aisée (in English: comfortable suburb) for Neuilly, and to a banlieue défavorisée (in English: disadvantaged suburb) for Clichy-sous-Bois.

Paris 

The Paris region can be divided into several zones. In the northwest and the northeast, many areas are vestiges of former working-class and industrial zones, in the case of Seine-Saint-Denis and Val-d'Oise. In the west, the population is generally upper class, and the centre of business and finance, La Défense, is also located there. Versailles, Le Vésinet, Sceaux, Maisons-Laffitte and Neuilly-sur-Seine are affluent suburbs of Paris, while Clichy-sous-Bois, Bondy and Corbeil-Essonnes are less so.

The southeast banlieues are less homogenous. Close to Paris, there are many communities that are considered "sensitive" or unsafe (Bagneux, Malakoff, Massy, Cachan, Les Ulis), divided by residential zones with a better reputation (Verrières-le-Buisson, Bourg-la-Reine, Antony, Fontenay-aux-Roses, Sceaux).

The farther away from the Paris city centre, the more the banlieues of the south of Paris can be divided into two zones. On one side, there are the banks of the Seine, where working-class residents used to live (there are still pockets of disadvantaged areas) but also other areas that are especially well off. Also are large cities close to Paris, such as Chanteloup-les-Vignes, Sartrouville, Les Mureaux, Mantes-la-Jolie, Poissy, Achères, Limay, Trappes, Aubergenville, Évry-Courcouronnes, Grigny, Corbeil-Essonnes, Saint-Michel-sur-Orge, Brétigny-sur-Orge, Sainte-Geneviève-des-Bois and Fleury-Mérogis.

On the other hand, small communities that are affluent can be found in the Yvelines department with Villennes-sur-Seine, Chatou, Croissy-sur-Seine, Le Pecq, Maisons-Laffitte but also in the Essonne and Seine-et-Marne departments: Etiolles, Draveil, Soisy-sur-Seine, Saint-Pierre-du-Perray or Seine-Port.

Paris: Banlieues rouges
The banlieues rouges ("red banlieues") are the outskirt districts of Paris where, traditionally, the French Communist Party held mayorships and other elected positions. Examples of these include Ivry-sur-Seine and Malakoff. Such communities often named streets after Soviet personalities, such as rue Youri Gagarine.

Lyon and Marseille 
The banlieues of large cities like Lyon and Marseille, like those of Paris, have also tended to suffer from a negative reputation. Ever since the French Commune government of 1871, they were and still are often ostracised and considered by other residents as places that are "lawless" or "outside the Republic", as opposed to "deep France", or "authentic France" associated with the provinces. However, it is in the banlieues that the young working households are found that raise children and pay taxes but lack in public services, in transportation, education, sports, as well as employment opportunities.

Crime and protests

Since the 1980s, petty crime has increased in France, much of it blamed on juvenile delinquency fostered within the banlieues. As a result, the banlieues are perceived to have become unsafe places to live, and youths from the banlieues are perceived to be one important source of increased petty crimes and uncivil behaviour. This criminality was addressed by  the Front National, a far-right political party led by Jean-Marie Le Pen, which rose to prominence during the early 1990s on a platform of tougher law enforcement and immigration control.

1981 riots 
In the summer of 1981, events involving young Franco-Maghrebis were met with varying reactions from the French public. Within the banlieues, events, called rodeos, would occur, where young "banlieusards" would steal cars and perform stunts and race them. Then, before the police could catch them, they would abandon the cars and set them on fire.

In July and August 1981, around 250 cars were vandalised. Grassroots groups began to demonstrate in public in 1983 and 1984 to publicise the problems of the Beurs and immigrants in France.

2005 riots 

Violent clashes between hundreds of youths and French police in the Paris banlieue of Clichy-sous-Bois began on 27 October 2005 and continued for more than 17 nights. The 2005 Paris suburb riots were triggered by the deaths of two teenagers (of black and Maghrebi descent) allegedly attempting to hide from police in an electrical substation, who were electrocuted.

2020 riots 
From 18 April 2020, Paris saw several nights of violent clashes over police treatment of ethnic minorities in the banlieues during the COVID-19 lockdown.

Filmography
A number of films, both fiction and documentary, have focused on the banlieues. A selection are listed below.
 L'amour existe, Maurice Pialat, 1961
 Two or Three Things I Know About Her, Jean-Luc Godard, 1967
 Elle court, elle court la banlieue, Gérard Pirès, 1973
 Série noire, Alain Corneau, 1979
 La Haine, Mathieu Kassovitz, 1995
 100% Arabica, Mahmoud Zemmouri, 1997
 Ma 6-T va crack-er, Jean-François Richet, 1997
 Games of Love and Chance, Abdellatif Kechiche, 2004
 District 13, Pierre Morel, 2004
 La Journée de la jupe, Jean-Paul Lilienfeld, 2008
 Neuilly Yo Mama!, Gabriel Julien-Laferrière, 2008
 Tout ce qui brille, Géraldine Nakache, 2010
 Beur sur la ville, Djamel Bensalah, 2011
 Porn in the Hood, Franck Gastambide, 2012
 On the Other Side of the Tracks''', Bertrand Tavernier, 2012
 Girlhood, Céline Sciamma, 2014
 Divines, Houda Benyamina, 2016
 Les Misérables, Ladj Ly, 2019
 Athena, Romain Gavras, 2022

See also

Aire urbaine
Bidonville
Faubourg
Poverty in France#Bidonvilles
Sensitive urban zone

References

Further reading
 Bronner, Luc (2010): La loi du ghetto : Enquête sur les banlieues françaises, Calmann-Lévy, Paris, 
 Dikec, Mustafa (2007): Badlands of the Republic: Space, Politics and Urban Policy. 
 Glasze, Georg; Robert Pütz, Mélina Germes et al. (2012): The Same but not the Same: the Discursive Constitution of Large Housing Estates in Germany, France and Poland. Urban Geography (33) 8: 1192–1211 

External links

The New French Ghettos by Hervé Marchal & Jean-Marc Stébé, in Metropolitics.eu, 16 December 2010. 
The Barbarians at the Gates of Paris by Theodore Dalrymple in City Journal, Autumn 2002.
The Other France – Are the suburbs of Paris incubators of terrorism? by George Packer in The New Yorker, 31 August 2015. 
So long, Marianne on burning girls and burning cars in France by Alice Schwarzer at signandsight.com
The price of disdain French author François Bon has spent years giving writing workshops to youths in the suburbs that are now being set ablaze. He looks critically at where the violence originated and with despair at where it is headed, at signandsight.com
French Riots Special A dossier with four related feature articles as well as a comprehensive collection of international voices from In Today's Feuilletons and the Magazine Roundup'' of sighandsight.com
From Paris to Cairo: Resistance of the Unacculturated
Website featuring underground rap music from the banlieues.
Troubled Suburbs Erupt Again
 Audio book (mp3) of the introduction and first chapter of Éric Maurin's book : Le ghetto français, enquête sur le séparatisme social

Geography of France
Human habitats
Welfare in France
Urbanization
Urban decay in Europe